Nothris radiata is a moth in the family Gelechiidae. It was described by Staudinger in 1879. It is found in Asia Minor and North Macedonia.

The wingspan is 23–26 mm. The forewings are yellowish grey with the veins streaked with black and with three black dots. The hindwings are light grey.

References

Chelariini
Moths described in 1879